Maverick is a 1994 American Western comedy film directed by Richard Donner, written by William Goldman, and starring Mel Gibson, Jodie Foster and James Garner. Based on the 1957–1962 television series of the same name created by Roy Huggins and originally starring James Garner, the film stars Gibson as Bret Maverick, a card player and con artist who collects money in order to enter a high-stakes poker game. He is joined in his adventure by Annabelle Bransford (Foster), another con artist, and Marshal Zane Cooper (Garner), a lawman. The supporting cast features Graham Greene, James Coburn, Alfred Molina and many cameo appearances by Western film actors, country music stars and other actors.

Released theatrically by Warner Bros. on May 20, 1994, the film was both a critical and commercial success, having grossed over $183 million worldwide. It was nominated for an Academy Award for Best Costume Design.

Plot
In the American Old West, gambler Bret Maverick is on his way to a major five-card draw poker tournament being held on the paddle steamer Lauren Belle, intending to prove he is the best card player alive. Short $3,000 of the $25,000 tournament entry fee, Maverick travels to the town of Crystal River, to collect on debts and accrue poker winnings. During one game, he encounters the ill-tempered gambler Angel and young con artist Annabelle Bransford. He wins a massive pot from Angel, but is forced to flee without his winnings.

Maverick and Bransford share a stagecoach with Marshal Zane Cooper, and together the three set out of Crystal River. They narrowly escape a fatal plunge into a ravine after their elderly driver suddenly dies, and later aid a group of missionary settlers who have been robbed by bandits disguised as Indians. The settlers offer Maverick a percentage of the recovered money they desperately need to start their mission, while one spinster missionary suggests marriage to Cooper, but both men turn down their offers. The trio and the settlers are then suddenly cornered by a large band of real Indians whose leader, Joseph, is an old friend of Maverick; however, no one else in the group is aware of this fact. Maverick feigns sacrificing himself to allow the others to escape, then tries to collect the $1,000 that Joseph owes him. The two swindle a Russian Archduke out of the needed amount with a scheme that "allows" him to hunt and kill an Indian (Maverick, in disguise).

Still seething over his loss in the Crystal River game, Angel receives a telegram instructing him to stop Maverick. Angel and his mercenaries catch Maverick and try to hang him, but he escapes after they have departed. Still $2,000 short, he makes his way to the Lauren Belle and finds Bransford, who is still $4,000 short herself. Spotting the Archduke aboard, Maverick poses as a Bureau of Indian Affairs agent investigating the shooting of Indians for game, conning the Archduke out of $6,000 to cover his and Bransford's entry.

Commodore Duvall welcomes the competitors to the tournament, with Cooper overseeing the security of the game and the $500,000 prize money and watching for any cheaters, who are summarily thrown overboard when discovered. Maverick, Angel, Bransford, and Duvall advance to the winner-take-all final. Prior to this game, Maverick and Bransford have a tryst in his quarters. After Bransford leaves, Maverick finds he has been locked in to attempt to make him forfeit the game, but manages to climb outside the steamer to reach the table on time. After Bransford has been eliminated, Maverick notices that the dealer is engaging in bottom dealing and has Angel give him the top card from the deck in order to prevent further cheating. All three men bet their remaining chips; Angel and Duvall reveal strong hands, but Maverick has received the one card he needs to complete a royal flush. Angel and his men draw their weapons, but Cooper and Maverick shoot first, killing them.

During the closing ceremony, Cooper steals the prize money and escapes. Later that night, Cooper secretly meets with Duvall, revealing that the two had struck a deal to steal the money for themselves and that Angel was working for Duvall. As Duvall draws a gun and tries to break the deal, Maverick appears and takes back the money, having tracked them down. Some time Later, Cooper corners Maverick while the latter is enjoying a hot bath; the two are father and son and had planned this scheme long in advance. As both men relax in the baths, Bransford arrives, having discerned their relationship from their similar physiques and mannerisms. She takes the satchel containing the prize money and departs, after which Maverick reveals to Cooper that he had followed the latter's advice and hidden half of it in his boots. He muses that retrieving the stolen $250,000 will be fun.

Cast

 Mel Gibson as Bret Maverick
 Jodie Foster as Annabelle Bransford
 James Garner as Zane Cooper
 Graham Greene as Joseph
 Alfred Molina as Angel
 James Coburn as Commodore Duvall 
 Dub Taylor as Room Clerk
 Dan Hedaya as Twitchy
 Paul L. Smith as Archduke
 Geoffrey Lewis as Matthew Wicker
 Max Perlich as John Wesley Hardin

There are various cameo appearances in the film from Western actors, people who have formerly worked with Donner, Gibson, Foster, or Garner, and other celebrities including Danny Glover (uncredited), Hal Ketchum and Corey Feldman as bank robbers; Read Morgan and Steve Kahan as card dealers; Art LaFleur and Leo Gordon as poker players at Maverick's first game; Paul Brinegar as the stagecoach driver; Denver Pyle as a cheating old gambler; Robert Fuller, Doug McClure, Henry Darrow, William Smith and Charles Dierkop as riverboat poker players; William Marshall as a riverboat poker player defeated by Angel; Dennis Fimple as Stuttering, a player beaten by the Commodore; Bert Remsen as an elderly riverboat gambler beaten by Maverick; and Margot Kidder as missionary Margaret Mary, colleague of missionary Mary Margaret, in an uncredited appearance. Additional cameos cut from the film included Alice Cooper as the town drunk, Linda Hunt as a magician and Clint Walker as a Sheriff.

Leo Gordon had played a semi-regular supporting character in seasons one and two of the original Maverick TV show: gambler Big Mike McComb.  Gordon also later wrote a few episodes of the show.  Margot Kidder had been Garner's co-star and onscreen love interest in the short-lived western TV series Nichols, reflected in their meeting in Maverick when her character quickly hints that his character might want to marry her.  Danny Glover's cameo appearance references Donner's Lethal Weapon film series starring Glover and Gibson as cop partners. Their meeting in Maverick sees them share a moment of recognition, complete with Lethal Weapon music, and as he leaves, Glover says Roger Murtaugh's catchphrase: "I'm too old for this shit."

Country singers also cameo including Carlene Carter as a waitress, Waylon Jennings and Kathy Mattea as a gambling couple with concealed guns, Reba McEntire as a spectator in the opening poker game, Clint Black as a sweet-faced gambler thrown overboard for cheating, and Vince Gill and his then-wife Janis Gill as spectators.

Production

Development
In Five Screenplays with Essays, Goldman describes an earlier version of the script, in which Maverick explains he has a magic ability to call the card he needs out of the deck. Although he is not able to do so successfully, the old hermit he attempts to demonstrate it for tells him that he really does have the magic in him. This scene was shot with Linda Hunt playing the hermit but it was felt it did not work in the context of the rest of the movie and was cut.

Garner wrote in his memoirs that Richard Donner originally wanted Paul Newman to play Zane Cooper but Newman was not interested.

Filming
Parts of the film were shot at Lake Powell and Warm Creek in Utah. Other filming locations include Lee's Ferry and Marble Canyon in Arizona, Lone Pine, Manzanar, Big Pine, and Yosemite National Park in California, and Columbia River Gorge in Oregon.

Vehicles

The steamboat used in the film—dubbed the Lauren Belle—was the Portland, the last remaining sternwheel tugboat in the US; at the time it belonged to the Oregon Maritime Museum in Portland. Over several weeks, the boat was decorated to alter its appearance to resemble a Mississippi-style gambling boat, including the addition of two decorative chimneys. In August 1993, the production requested permission to film scenes of the riverboat along the Columbia River in Washington State. The artificial smoke released by the boat's chimney was considered to violate air-quality laws in Washington and Oregon and required approval for the scenes before their scheduled filming date in September 1993. After filming concluded, the decorations were removed and the boat was returned to its original state.

Soundtrack

The soundtrack featured three chart singles: "Renegades, Rebels and Rogues" by Tracy Lawrence, "A Good Run of Bad Luck" by Clint Black (which also appeared on his album No Time to Kill), and "Something Already Gone" by Carlene Carter. Also included on the album was an all-star rendition of "Amazing Grace", from which all royalties were donated to the Elizabeth Glaser Pediatric AIDS Foundation.

Reception

Box office
The film earned $101,631,272 (55.5%) in North America and $81,400,000 (44.5%) elsewhere for a worldwide total of $183,031,272. This gross made it the 12th highest-grossing film in North America and the 15th highest-grossing film worldwide of 1994. As of 2013, the film is the 6th highest grossing Western film in North America.

Pre-release tracking showed that the film would open strongly,. During its opening weekend in North America, Maverick earned $17.2 million from 2,537 theaters – an average of $6,798 per theater – ranking as the number 1 film of the weekend, and took a total of $41.8 million over its first two weeks of release.

The movie was a box office success as it grossed over $183 million worldwide.

Critical response
Maverick has received generally favorable reviews. On Rotten Tomatoes the film has a 67% rating based on reviews from 54 critics, with an average rating of 6/10. The site's consensus states: "It isn't terribly deep, but it's witty and undeniably charming, and the cast is obviously having fun." On Metacritic it has a score of 62% based on reviews from 28 critics, indicating "generally favorable reviews". Audiences surveyed by CinemaScore gave the film a grade A− on scale of A to F.

James Berardinelli, from reelviews.net, gave the film three and a half stars out of four. He stated, "The strength of Maverick is the ease with which it switches from comedy to action, and back again....it's refreshing to find something that satisfies expectations." Reviewing it for the Chicago Sun-Times, Roger Ebert gave the film three stars out of four, writing that the film is "the first lighthearted, laugh-oriented family Western in a long time, and one of the nice things about it is, it doesn't feel the need to justify its existence. It acts like it's the most natural thing in the world to be a Western."

Other media
In September 1994, Data East pinball released a pinball machine based on the film.  The backglass featured the likeness of Mel Gibson, Jodie Foster and other stars of the film.

References

External links

 
 
 
 James Garner Interview on the Charlie Rose Show

1994 films
1990s English-language films
1990s adventure comedy films
1990s Western (genre) comedy films
American adventure comedy films
American Western (genre) comedy films
Films about con artists
Films based on television series
Films directed by Richard Donner
Films produced by Bruce Davey
Films with screenplays by William Goldman
Films scored by Randy Newman
Films set in Oregon
Films shot in Oregon
Films shot in Arizona
Films shot in Utah
Films shot in California
Icon Productions films
Warner Bros. films
Films about poker
Films about gambling
1994 comedy films
1990s American films
Maverick (TV series)